Haroun Kabadi (born 29 April 1949) is a Chadian politician. He was Prime Minister of Chad from June 2002 to June 2003 and was the President of the National Assembly of Chad from June 2011 to April 2021.

Politics
Kabadi is a member of the Patriotic Salvation Movement (MPS). From January 1998 to July 1998, he was Minister of Communications and Government Spokesman. He then became managing director of the Société cotonnière du Tchad, the parastatal cotton company, before being appointed as Prime Minister on June 12, 2002. Later in June 2002, while reading his government programme to the National Assembly, Kabadi collapsed, reportedly due to high blood pressure and forgetting his medication; he quickly recovered after being carried into another room. He remained Prime Minister for one year until President Idriss Déby appointed Moussa Faki to replace him in June 2003.

On March 4, 2007, he was appointed as Minister of State for Agriculture, serving in that post until he was replaced in the government named on April 23, 2008.

Kabadi also served as Secretary-General of the Presidency for a time. He was elected to replace Nagoum Yamassoum as Secretary-General of the MPS in January 2011. Elected to a seat in the National Assembly in the February 2011 parliamentary election, Kabadi was then elected as President of the National Assembly in June 2011. Adrien Beyom succeeded Kabadi as Secretary-General of the MPS in October 2012 at the party's fifth congress.

In October 2021, Haroun Kabadi was appointed president of the National Transitional Council, the provisional parliament appointed by the ruling junta since Idriss Déby’s death in April 2021.

References 

1949 births
Living people
Agriculture ministers of Chad
Communication ministers of Chad
Heads of government of Chad
Members of the National Assembly (Chad)
Patriotic Salvation Movement politicians
Presidents of the National Assembly (Chad)